"Cha Cha Twist" is a 1960 song by Brice Coefield. A song called "Cha Cha Twist" was also recorded by Connie Francis in 1962 on MGM, and by Paul Gallis on Heartbreak Records.

Detroit Cobras version
The track was the debut CD and 7" single of American band The Detroit Cobras in 2004.

Track listing

CD version 
 "Cha Cha Twist" - 2:30
 "The Real Thing" - 1:48
 "Cha Cha Twist" (Video)

Vinyl version 
 "Cha Cha Twist"
 "Hey Sailor"

References 

1960 songs
2004 singles
Rough Trade Records singles